Garbo: The Spy (also known as Garbo, the Man Who Saved the World and Garbo: El Espia) is a Spanish documentary about Juan Pujol Garcia's role in the Second World War, directed by Edmon Roch.

The documentary reconstructs the career of "Garbo," who formed the centerpiece of Allied deception and counter-information to have the Nazis believe that D-Day landing would occur in Pas-de-Calais and not in Normandy.

A number of individuals are interviewed including Nigel West (the pseudonym of intelligence expert Rupert Allason) and  Aline Griffith, Countess of Romanones, a former OSS agent, as well as historian Mark Seaman, investigative journalist Xavier Vinader, and psychiatrist Stan Vranckx.

Release
Garbo premiered at the Rome Film Festival on October 20, 2009, opened in Spain on December 4, 2009 and opened at the Village East Cinema in New York on July 23, 2010.

See also
 Operation Fortitude

References

External links
 
 
 
 
 Interview with the Director

2009 films
2000s Spanish-language films
2009 documentary films
Spanish documentary films
Documentary films about World War II
Spanish spy films
Films scored by Fernando Velázquez
2000s Spanish films